Pavel Baudiš (born 15 May 1960) is a Czech software engineer, entrepreneur and the co-founder of Avast along with Eduard Kučera. As of 2022, he is the 8th wealthiest person in the Czech Republic, with a net worth of more than 54.5 billion Czech koruna according to Forbes.

Born in Prague, he graduated in Information Technology from the Prague University of Chemical Technology. He then worked as a Graphics Specialist at the Mathematical Research Institute.

He entered business began with his friend Eduard Kučera at the end of the communist regime in 1989, when he founded Alwil. In the early 1990s, the company was renamed Avast Software, based on its best known product, Avast Antivirus. It soon faced intense competition, especially from Symantec, which used an aggressive pricing policy in a bid to lead the market. In response Baudiš and Kucera took a radical defense strategy, offering its product for free. As a result, Avast ultimately emerged as the largest anti-virus firm in the world.

References

Czech company founders
Czech business executives
Czech billionaires
1960 births
Living people
Czech software engineers